The Shipment may refer to:

 "The Shipment" (Star Trek: Enterprise), a Star Trek: Enterprise television episode from season three (2003)
 The Shipment (film), a 2001 movie about a mob enforcer who is hired to recover a shipment of Viagra gone awry